Voodoo Man is a 1944 American horror film directed by William Beaudine and starring Bela Lugosi, John Carradine, and George Zucco.

Plot 
Nicholas (George Zucco) runs a filling station in the sticks. In reality, he is helping Dr. Richard Marlowe (Bela Lugosi) capture comely young ladies so he can transfer their life essences to his long-dead wife. Also assisting is Toby (John Carradine), who lovingly shepherds the left-over zombie girls and pounds on bongos during voodoo ceremonies. The hero is a Hollywood screenwriter who, at the end of the picture, turns the experience into a script titled "Voodoo Man". When his producer asks who should star in it, the hero suggests ... Bela Lugosi.

Cast 

 Bela Lugosi as Dr. Marlowe
 John Carradine as Toby
 George Zucco as Nicholas
 Wanda McKay as Betty
 Louise Currie as Sally
 Michael Ames as Ralph
 Ellen Hall as Mrs. Marlowe
 Terry Walker as Alice
 Mary Currier as Mrs. Benton
 Claire James as Zombie
 Henry Hall as Sheriff
 Dan White as Deputy
 Pat McKee as Grego
 Mici Goty as Housekeeper

Uncredited (in order of appearance)
John Ince as S. K. [initials of Banner Productions' founder Sam Katzman], producer at Banner Motion Picture Company, who asks Ralph to write a screenplay for a horror film

Production 
This film, along with Return of the Ape Man, shot in seven days beginning on October 16, 1943, were Lugosi's final Monogram features. Both films also featured John Carradine, George Zucco, Michael Ames and Mary Currier. The film title was originally "Tiger Man" by author Andrew Colvin but was later changed as Voodoo Man and Colvin got no screen credit.

References

External links 

1944 horror films
1944 films
American black-and-white films
American supernatural horror films
1940s English-language films
Films about Voodoo
Films directed by William Beaudine
Mad scientist films
Monogram Pictures films
American zombie films
1940s American films